The International Journal of Corpus Linguistics is a quarterly peer-reviewed academic journal that publishes scholarly articles and book reviews on corpus linguistics, with a focus on applied linguistics. The journal is published by John Benjamins Publishing Company. The current editor-in-chief is Michaela Mahlberg (University of Birmingham). According to the Journal Citation Reports, the journal has a 2018 impact factor of 0.976.

References

External links

English-language journals
John Benjamins academic journals
Quarterly journals
Publications established in 1995
Corpus linguistics journals
Applied linguistics